The 2018 West Kalimantan gubernatorial election took place on 27 June 2018 as part of the simultaneous local elections. It was held to elect the governor of West Kalimantan along with their deputy, whilst members of the provincial council (Dewan Perwakilan Rakyat Daerah) will be re-elected in 2019.

With incumbent Cornelis M.H. barred after serving two full terms, the election was contested by three pairs of candidates: Pontianak mayor Sutarmidji, Landak regent Karolin Margret Natasa and former regent of Sintang Milton Crosby.

The election resulted in victory for Sutarmidji, who secured 51.5 percent of the votes. Karolin came in second with 41.8 percent while Milton won less than 7 percent of votes.

Timeline
Registration for party-backed candidates were opened between 8 and 10 January 2018, while independent candidates were required to register between 22 and 26 November 2017. The numerical order of the candidates were determined on 13 February through a lottery. In April 2018, the provincial KPU set the number of voters at 3,436,127. The campaigning period would commence between 15 February and 24 June, with a three-day election silence before voting on 27 June.

Candidates

In addition, an independent ticket also registered, but failed to submit a sufficient number of supporting ID cards.

References

West Kalimantan
2018 Indonesian gubernatorial elections